Eucalliathla is a genus of moths of the family Yponomeutidae.

Species
Eucalliathla candidella - Blanchard, 1852

References

Yponomeutidae